Ákos Baki (born 24 August 1994) is a Hungarian professional footballer who plays for MTK Budapest II.

In December 2013, Baki had a trial with English Premier League club Swansea City

Club statistics

Updated to games played as of 28 August 2021.

References

External links
MLSZ 
HLSZ 

1994 births
Living people
People from Zalaegerszeg
Hungarian footballers
Hungary under-21 international footballers
Association football defenders
MTK Budapest FC players
Mezőkövesdi SE footballers
Nemzeti Bajnokság I players
Sportspeople from Zala County